William Napoleon Barleycorn (1848–1925), born in Santa Isabel, Fernando Po, Spanish Guinea and a Krio Fernandino of Igbo descent, was a Primitive Methodist missionary who went to Fernando Po (now known as Bioko) in Africa in the early 1880s. From there, he traveled to Edinburgh University.

Early life
He was the son of Napoleon Barleycorn, also a Primitive Methodist missionary in Fernando Po, who sent his sons to be educated at Bourne College in Quinton, England. He, additionally, studied in Barcelona, Spain and Victoria, Cameroon.

Missionary work
During the early 1870s, William Barleycorn was a Sunday school teacher, a member of the Native Missionary Class, and a preacher at the local Bubi village of Basupu. In 1871 he abandoned running a small trading store and moved to San Carlos (North-West Bay) to work as an assistant for a European missionary. In 1873 he became the head of the Primitive Methodist Day School in San Carlos. Barleycorn made several trips to England, and received by the conference in Hull to serve as probationer in 1881.

Studying in Barcelona
In 1884 he became listed as one of the regular ministers, and studied in Barcelona for two years to obtain his Spanish teaching certificate. He became the visible leader of Santa Isabel's Fernandino community by the 1890s, and served as a patriarchal remnant of the Anglophone and Protestant influence on the island.

Bubi primer
Barleycorn compiled the first Bube primer in 1875 along with co-missionary William B. Luddington.

Two copies of Bubi na English primer compiled by William B. Luddington and William N. Barleycorn, 1875, are available for consultation in SOAS Library.

See also
Edward Barleycorn
Edward Thaddeus Barleycorn Barber
Gertrude Johnson Barleycorn
Napoleon Barleycorn
Jeremiah (Jeremias) Barleycorn

References

Methodist missionaries in Equatorial Guinea
Missionary linguists
Translators from English
Bubi
1848 births
1925 deaths
Methodist ministers
Fernandino people
19th-century Spanish Guinean people
20th-century Spanish Guinean people
Igbo missionaries
20th-century translators
Equatoguinean Methodist missionaries